Graeme Petersen is a former football (soccer) goalkeeper who represented New Zealand at international level.

Petersen made a solitary official international appearance for New Zealand in a 0–4 loss to New Caledonia on 8 November 1967.

References 

Living people
New Zealand association footballers
New Zealand international footballers
Association football goalkeepers
Stop Out players
1941 births